Social advertising can refer to:
 Social advertising (social relationships), advertising using the social environment to reach its target audience
 Social advertising (social issues), advertising about social issues

Social science disambiguation pages